The Delage D8 was an eight-cylinder luxury car produced by Delage between 1929 and 1940.

The 4061 cc engine of the original D8 placed it in the 23CV car tax band which also defined its position high up in the market hierarchy.

Delage provided rolling chassis to be bodied and fitted out by prestigious carroussiers such as Letourneur et Marchand and Chapron operating (in most cases) in the Paris area.   The result was that the D8 appeared, throughout its life, in a wide variety of (frequently) elegant coupé, cabriolet, sedan/saloon or roadster shapes.

Chronology
The D8 was introduced late in 1929 as a replacement for the opulent Delage GLS, but in view of the range of body types (and, subsequently, of engine sizes) with which it was offered it can also be seen as a replacement for the some versions of the Delage DM.

It was launched when the European economy was still reeling from the aftermath of the 1929 stock market crashes - though cars at this level were never intended to sell in large numbers.  By taking sales from other top end auto-makers such as, in particular, Bugatti, the D8 became one of the best known products of what subsequently came to be known as a "golden age" for low-volume expensive and luxurious cars in France.

Chassis

Two versions of the D8 were launched: the “D8 Normale” and the short-wheelbase “D8 S”.   

The short-wheelbase “D8 S” was optimized for manoeuvrability and handling in sports car applications.

Both versions were produced till 1933.

Engine
The "Delage D8" was powered by a straight 8 engine which was a first both for Delage and for the French auto-industry. Power was delivered to the rear wheels through a four speed manual gear-box featuring synchromesh on the upper two ratios.

Although performance varied according to vehicle weight, top speed listed for the "D8 Normale" was 120 km/h (75 mph), with 130 km/h (82 mph) listed for the "D8 S".

Brakes and suspension
The drum brakes operated on all four wheels.   Suspension was traditional, involving rigid axles front and back with semi-elliptic leaf springs and “friction dampers”.

Further Developments

Delage D8-15 (1933 – 1934)

In 1933 Delage introduced the “D8-15” in which the size of the 8-cylinder engine had been reduced to 2668 cc.   The “-15” suffix referred to the 15CV car tax band in which the smaller engine placed the car.   The lesser performance of this version of the Delage D8 moved the model downmarket in the direction of volume automakers such as Citroën who were already working on a 16 CV 6-cylinder version of their newly introduced Traction model (although the project seems to have been a low priority for Citroën and the car in question would only appear in the market, initially very cautiously, in June 1938).

The 15CV Delage D8, like the original 23CV version, was produced both in “-Normale” versions and in a shorter wheelbase “-S” version.   However, the Delage D8-15 had been withdrawn by the end of 1934.

Delage D8-85 and Delage D8-105 (1934 – 1935) 

The same year saw the launch of the “D8-85 » and the « D8 105 ». On The D8-105 the engine size was the same, but the unit was modified to produce , while the car sat on a shortened  chassis.

In April 1935 the manufacturer’s financial difficulties culminated in the closure of Delage plant at Courbevoie, as a result of which the D8-85 and Delage D8-105 were taken out of production.

Delage D8-100 (1936 - 1940) 
The arrangements with Delahaye were worked through over a period of several years, with Delage effectively a Delahaye subsidiary by 1938.   Walter Watney, the British born entrepreneurs who established in 1935 the Delage sales and marketing company “SAFAD”  remained in post till 1940.   Greater urgency was needed over the question of where to build the cars now that the Delage factory had closed.   The solution already in place by 1936 involved continuing production of Delage engines and retaining other mechanical components, but installing them on existing Delahaye chassis.

The first D8 to be produced at the Delahaye Paris plant under the new arrangements was the D8-100.   In this period Delahaye were producing cars with fashionably flamboyant bodies from bespoke body builders such as Figoni et Falaschi and Saoutchik, and the Delage cars followed the same trends.   The D8 as the top “mainstream” Delage model, turned up, during the second half of the decade, with various fabulously aerodynamic profiles.   Coachbuilders who had traditionally worked closely with Delage during the years of independence, chief among them Letourneur & Marchand and their subsidiary, Autobineau, were also responsible for many eye catching D8 bodied cars during this time.

By this time the Cotal pre-selector transmission, previously an option, came included in the price of a Delage D8. Delahayes were still powered by six-cylinder engines, and the Delage D8 was the top model produced under either brand.

Delage D8-120 (1937 - 1940) 

By October 1937 Delage were also listing at the Paris motor show a « D8-120 » model, which was essentially a « D8-100 » with the cylinder bore/diameter increased by 4 mm.   Listed power was now  at 4,500 rpm.  A long-wheelbase D8 120 was featured prominently in An American in Paris. (Image here.)

Unusual is the Aerosport Coupé, which featured a pillarless hardtop body ten years before General Motors introduced hardtops for their Buick and Cadillac lines.

In 1939 the larger engine from the D8-120 also found its way into the D8-100.   However, with the declaration of war in 1939 and the invasion of northern France, in 1940, passenger car production came to an end, as the Delahaye plant was taken over by the German military occupation.  Although the six-cylinder Delages would return in 1946, after the war, the eight-cylinder D-8 did not.

External links 
 Images of Delage D8 120's used in movies displayed at the Internet Movie Cars Database
 Interesting on-line summary on Delage (in French)

References

1930s cars
Delahaye vehicles
Delage vehicles
Cars introduced in 1929